The Genius Hits the Road is a 1960 album by Ray Charles. The concept album focuses on songs written about various parts of the United States. It peaked at number nine on the pop album charts and produced a US #1 single, "Georgia on My Mind".

Track listing

Original LP release
Side 1
"Alabamy Bound" (Buddy DeSylva, Bud Green, Ray Henderson) – 1:55
"Georgia on My Mind" (Hoagy Carmichael, Stuart Gorrell) – 3:35
"Basin Street Blues" (Spencer Williams) – 2:46
"Mississippi Mud" (Harry Barris, James Cavanaugh) – 3:24
"Moonlight In Vermont" (John Blackburn, Karl Suessdorf) – 3:02
"New York's My Home" (Gordon Jenkins) – 3:05
Side 2
"California, Here I Come" (Buddy DeSylva, Al Jolson, Joseph Meyer) – 2:10
"Moon Over Miami" (Joe Burke, Edgar Leslie) – 3:20
"Deep in the Heart of Texas" (June Hershey, Don Swander) – 2:28
"Carry Me Back to Old Virginny" (James A. Bland) – 2:02
"Blue Hawaii" (Ralph Rainger, Leo Robin) – 2:58
"Chattanooga Choo Choo" (Mack Gordon, Harry Warren) – 3:05

1997 Rhino CD re-issue bonus tracks
"Sentimental Journey" (Brown, Green, Homer) – 2:58
"Hit The Road Jack" (Percy Mayfield) – 2:00
"Blue Moon of Kentucky" (Bill Monroe) – 2:12
"Rainy Night in Georgia" (Tony Joe White) – 6:16 
"I'm Movin' On" (Hank Snow) – 2:29
"Swanee River Rock (Talkin' 'Bout That River)" (Ray Charles)– 2:20
"Lonely Avenue" (Doc Pomus) – 2:34

2009 Concord CD re-issue bonus tracks
"Hit The Road Jack" (Mayfield) – 2:00
"Sentimental Journey" (Brown, Green, Homer) – 2:58
"Blue Moon of Kentucky" (Monroe) – 2:13
"Rainy Night in Georgia" (White) – 6:16 
"The Long and Winding Road" (Lennon, McCartney) - 3:14
"I Was on Georgia Time" (Charles) - 3:28
"Take Me Home, Country Roads" (Danoff, Denver, Nivert) - 3:34

Personnel
Ray Charles – vocals, piano
Edgar Willis – bass 
Milt Turner – drums 
David 'Fathead' Newman – tenor saxophone
Hank Crawford – alto saxophone
Leroy Cooper – baritone saxophone
John Hunt – trumpet
Marcus Belgrave – trumpet
Ralph Burns – arranger, conductor 
Sid Feller – producer

1997 Rhino CD re-issue bonus track personnel 
Ray Charles – piano, vocals
Edgar Willis – bass (tracks 14, 17, 18)
Roosevelt Sheffield – bass (track 19) 
Mel Lewis – drums (track 14)
Teagle Fleming – drums (tracks 17)
William Peeples – drums (tracks 18, 19) 
David 'Fathead' Newman – tenor saxophone (tracks 14, 17 to 19), alto saxophone (tracks 18, 19)
Hank Crawford – alto saxophone (tracks 14, 17), baritone saxophone (track 17)
Leroy Cooper – baritone saxophone (track 14)
Emmet Dennis – baritone saxophone (tracks 18, 19)
John Hunt – trumpet (tracks 14, 17, 19)
Marcus Belgrave – trumpet (track 17)
Joe Bridgewater – trumpet (tracks: 18, 19)
The Raelettes – vocals (tracks 15, 17, 19)
The Jack Halloran singers – vocals (track 2, 15) 
The Cookies – vocals (track 19)
Frank Rosolino – trombone (track 14)
Harry Betts – trombone (track 14)
Kenny Shroyer – trombone (track 14)
Richard Nash – trombone (track 14) 
Bruno Carr – percussion (track 14)
Ahmet Ertegün – producer (tracks 17, 18 19) 
Jerry Wexler – producer (tracks 17, 18 19)

References

ABC-Paramount 335

1960 albums
Ray Charles albums
ABC Records albums
Albums produced by Jerry Wexler
Albums produced by Ahmet Ertegun
Albums produced by Sid Feller
Albums conducted by Ralph Burns
Albums arranged by Ralph Burns
Concept albums